The 1992 Commonwealth Final was the ninth running of the Commonwealth Final as part of the qualification for the 1992 Speedway World Championship. The 1992 Final was run on 31 May at the Norfolk Arena in King's Lynn, England, and was part of the World Championship qualifying for riders from the Commonwealth nations.

Riders qualified for the Final from the Australian, British and New Zealand Championships.

1992 Commonwealth Final
31 May
 King's Lynn, Norfolk Arena
Qualification: Top 11 plus 1 reserve to the Overseas Final in Coventry, England

References

See also
 Motorcycle Speedway

1992
World Individual
1992 in British motorsport
1992 in English sport